Genitopatellar syndrome is a rare disorder consisting of  congenital flexion contractures of the lower extremities, abnormal or missing patellae, and urogenital anomalies. Additional symptoms include microcephaly, severe psychomotor disability. 
In 2012, it was shown that mutations in the gene KAT6B cause the syndrome. Genitopatellar syndrome (GTPTS) can be caused by heterozygous mutation in the KAT6B gene on chromosome 10q22. The Say-Barber-Biesecker variant of Ohdo syndrome, which has many overlapping features with GTPTS, can also be caused by heterozygous mutation in the KAT6B gene.

Signs and symptoms
Genitopatellar syndrome is characterized by genital abnormalities, missing or underdeveloped kneecaps (patellae), intellectual disability and abnormalities affecting other parts of the body. It is also associated with delayed development and intellectual disability, which are often severe. Affected individuals may have an unusually small head (microcephaly) and structural brain abnormalities, including agenesis of the corpus callosum.

Major features include:
 Patellar hypoplasia/agenesis 
 Flexion contractures at the hips and knees
 Agenesis of the corpus callosum with microcephaly
 Hydronephrosis and/or multiple kidney cysts
 Atrial septal defect 
 Intestinal malrotation
 Talipes equinovarus (including club feet)
 Feeding difficulties

Other features may include:
 Dental anomalies (delayed eruption of teeth)
 Hearing loss
 Thyroid anomalies
 Anal anomalies
 Hypotonia
 Global developmental delay/intellectual disability

Cause
Genitopatellar syndrome is inherited in an autosomal dominant fashion. The mutation responsible for the syndrome occurs in the KAT6B gene. This gene is located on the long arm of chromosome 10 (10q22.2).

The KAT6B gene gene product is an enzyme called histone acetyltransferase which functions in regulating and making of histone which are proteins that attach to DNA and give the chromosomes their shape. The function of histone acetyltransferase produced from KAT6B is unknown but it is considered as a regulator of early development. There is little known about how the mutation in the KAT6B causes the syndrome but researchers suspects that the mutations occur near the end of the KAT6B gene and causes it to produce shortened acetyltransferase enzyme. The shortened enzyme alters the regulation of other genes. On the other hand, the mutation of KAT6B leading to the specific features of genitopatellar syndrome is still not surely proven.

Diagnosis
Even though clinical diagnostic criteria have not been 100 percent defined for genitopatellar syndrome, the researchers stated that the certain physical features could relate to KAT6B mutation and result in the molecular genetic testing. The researchers stated that the Individuals with two major features or one major feature and two minor features are likely to have a KAT6B mutation.
To diagnose the Genitopatellar Syndrome, there are multiple ways to evaluate. The primary method of diagnosing Genitopatellar Syndrome is through molecular genetic testing.

 Evaluation by developmental specialist
 Feeding evaluation
 Baseline hearing evaluation
 Thyroid function tests
 Evaluation of males for cryptorchidism
 Orthopedic evaluation if contractures are present or feet/ankles are malpositioned
 Hip X-rays to evaluate for femoral head dislocation
 Kidney ultrasound examination for hydronephrosis and cysts
 Echocardiogram for congenital heart defects
 Evaluation for laryngomalacia if respiratory issues are present
 Evaluation by gastroenterologist as needed, particularly if bowel malrotation is suspected

Treatment
There is no cure for genitopatellar syndrome. However, there are treatments for the different symptoms. For the developmental symptoms, Educational intervention and speech therapy beginning in infancy could help to reduce the high risk for motor, cognitive, speech, and language delay. For the skeletal features, referral to an orthopedist for consideration of surgical release of contractures. In addition, early referral to physical therapy could help increase joint mobility. Lastly, thyroid hormone replacement could help out the thyroid dysfunction.

History
In 1988, Goldblatt et al. first reported a 4-year-old boy with hypoplastic patellae, mental retardation, scrotal hypoplasia, skeletal deformities, kidney anomalies, flattened nasal bridge, and short stature. Later in 2000, Cormier-Daire et al. reported seven patients with genital anomalies (scrotal hypoplasia and cryptorchidism in the boys and clitoral hypertrophy in the girls), facial dysmorphism, kidney anomalies, absent patellae, and severe mental retardation in the two survivors. The condition is now known as genitopatellar syndrome.

See also
 Say-Barber-Biesecker-Young-Simpson syndrome
 KAT6B

References

External links 

Rare syndromes
Syndromes affecting the kidneys
Syndromes affecting head size